Racing Luck is a 1935 American action film directed by Sam Newfield and written by Joseph O'Donnell and George Wallace Sayre. The film stars William Boyd, Barbara Worth, George Ernest, Esther Muir, Ernest Hilliard and Onest Conley. The film was released on November 19, 1935, by Republic Pictures.

Plot
After the horse Life Belt is disqualified for a drug violation, trainer Dan Morgan is suspended from horse racing. He goes to work in a lesser role for June and Jimmy Curtis at their stables and tends to Color Sergeant, an injured horse.

A rival stable owner, Walker Hammond, is willing to go to any lengths to win. His men set fire to the Curtis stables, and when his horse Carnation scores a narrow victory over Color Sergeant in a big race, Morgan proves that Carnation is actually another horse, entered illegally. Hammond is now the one banned from the track.

Cast
William Boyd as Dan Morgan
Barbara Worth as June Curtis
George Ernest as Jimmy Curtis
Esther Muir as Elaine Bostwick
Ernest Hilliard as Walker Hammond
Onest Conley as Mose
Ben Hall as 'Knapsack'
Henry Roquemore as Tuttle
Dick Curtis as 'Dynamite'
Ted Caskey as Fred Millan
Joseph W. Girard as Commissioner 
Robert McKenzie as Rancher

References

External links
 

1935 films
1930s English-language films
American horse racing films
American action films
1930s action films
Republic Pictures films
Films directed by Sam Newfield
American black-and-white films
1930s American films